The Indian Political Intelligence Office (IPIO) was an intelligence organisation initially established in England in 1909 in response to the dissemination of anarchist and revolutionary elements of Indian nationalism to different countries in Europe after the liquidation of India House (where it was based between 1905 and 1910) in London in 1909. It formally came to be called the Indian Political Intelligence (IPI) from 1921.

By the time World War I broke out the IPIO, headed by John Wallinger, had been established in mainland Europe. In scale, this office was larger than those operated by the British War Office, approaching the size of the European intelligence network of the Secret Service Bureau. This network already had agents in Switzerland against possible German intrigues. After the outbreak of the war, Wallinger, under the cover of an officer of the British General Headquarters, proceeded to France where he operated out of Paris, working with the French Political Police, the Sûreté.<ref>: "With the outbreak of the First World War the Indian intelligence network set up by Superintendent Wallinger ... within the general structure of British intelligence in Europe ... In scale it was not much smaller than the European intelligence operations of the Secret Service Bureau, let alone those of the War Office. Moreover, John Wallinger already controlled agents operating in Switzerland, which was to become an important centre of German intrigue ... [he] had cultivated friendly relations with the Paris political police, the Sūreté.

Notes

References
International Institute for Asian Studies: Indian Political Intelligence Files Released for Research
.

Indian intelligence agencies
Hindu–German Conspiracy
Revolutionary movement for Indian independence
World War I espionage
Government of British India